The Șomuzul Mare is a right tributary of the river Siret in Romania. It discharges into the Siret near Dolhasca. It flows through the villages Stroiești, Zaharești, Liteni, Pocoleni, Fălticeni (city), Șoldănești, Huși, Preutești, Basarabi, Arghira, Dolheștii Mari, Dolheștii Mici and Dolhasca (town). The Șomuz and Pocoleni dams are built on this river.

Tributaries

The following rivers are tributaries to the river Șomuzul Mare (from source to mouth):

Left: Humoria, Frumoasa, Vătavu, Boroșeni, Cimbrina, Prisaca, Brana
Right: Stupca, Iazuri, Brădățel, Târgul, Leucușești, Platonița

References

Rivers of Romania
Rivers of Suceava County